Frederick Harmon Weight (1887–1978) was an American film director most prolific in the late silent film era of the 1920s. He directed many well-known performers such as George Arliss, Betty Compson, Myrna Loy and Rin-Tin-Tin. 

He was born in Salt Lake City, Utah and began his career in the theater. He was the assistand director on 1916 film The Corner.

Selected filmography

The Corner (1916), assistant director
The Ruling Passion (1922)
The Man Who Played God (1922)
The Ragged Edge (1923)
Ramshackle House (1924)
 On the Stroke of Three (1924)
Twenty Dollars a Week (1924)
Drusilla with a Million (1925)
Three of a Kind (1925), also released as Three Wise Crooks
Flaming Waters (1925)
A Poor Girl's Romance (1926)
Forever After (1926)
Hook and Ladder No. 9 (1927)
Midnight Madness (1928), produced by Cecil B. DeMille
Jazz Mad (1928)
Hardboiled Rose (1929)
Frozen River (1929)

References

External links

F. Harmon Weight at kinotv.com

1887 births
1978 deaths
Film directors from Utah
Silent film directors
People from Salt Lake City